Legedu A. Naanee (pronounced LEG-a-doo Nah-NAY, born September 16, 1983) is a former American football wide receiver. He was drafted by the San Diego Chargers in the fifth round of the 2007 NFL Draft. He played college football for the Boise State University Broncos. Naanee has also played for the Carolina Panthers and the Miami Dolphins.

Early years
Naanee attended Franklin High School in Portland, Oregon and was a student and a letterman in football, basketball, and baseball. In football, he was a four-year starter earning awards at quarterback and defensive back. In basketball, he won All-League honors as a junior.

College career
Although Naanee received scholarship offers from many Pac-10 and Big 12 schools, such as Oregon and Oregon State, Naanee chose to play college football at Boise State University because they were the only major program to offer him a chance to play quarterback, a position he cherished and played in high school. After Jared Zabransky won the starting job in 2004, Naanee realized that if he wanted to play, it had to be at another position.

Naanee filled in at receiver and although the transition and failure at quarterback was difficult, he said being able to "feel like you were part of things and contributing, that went out the window". He remarked, "maybe it was something that was meant to be, for me to go through something like that and then to switch."

Professional career

2007 NFL Draft
With Naanee playing most of his football career at  receiver, the Chargers selected Naanee with the 172nd overall selection in the 5th round of the 2007 NFL Draft.

San Diego Chargers
Naanee was targeted by Norv Turner to become the next star for the Chargers to become his F-Back project, much like Delanie Walker and Michael Robinson were when Turner was the offensive coordinator of the San Francisco 49ers. The F-Back is much like the H-back in other offenses in the sense it is a hybrid position (WR/TE/FB) purposely versatile to take advantage of mismatches.

Naanee was the starting number two receiver for the Chargers behind Malcom Floyd for much of the 2010 season. This is due to a holdout by the usual starter Vincent Jackson. Naanee caught a touchdown pass in his first start of the 2010 season on a 59-yard pass from quarterback Philip Rivers in the season opener against the Kansas City Chiefs.

Regarding his versatility, head coach Norv Turner said, "We're going to continue to move him. He's going to be a guy who's versatile enough to move around. That's going to help him be put in position to make some plays." On December 6, 2009, Naanee completed a pass on a flea flicker to LaDainian Tomlinson.

Arrest
He was arrested for public intoxication and resisting arrest at the scene of a homicide in Indianapolis on February 12, 2011.

Carolina Panthers
Naanee signed with the Carolina Panthers on August 4, 2011. He played the whole season as the number 3 receiver behind Steve Smith and Brandon LaFell. He caught 1 touchdown pass from Quarterback Cam Newton, but dropped more passes than he caught, including a wide open end zone pass that would have won the game for the Panthers. At the end of the season the Panthers did not renew his contract.

Miami Dolphins
Naanee signed a one-year deal with the Miami Dolphins on April 17. He was cut on October 2, 2012 after posting only one catch for 19 yards in his four-game tenure with the team.

Career statistics

Post-career life 
Naanee now owns four San Diego-area businesses.

References

1983 births
Living people
Players of American football from Portland, Oregon
American sportspeople of Nigerian descent
American football wide receivers
Boise State Broncos football players
San Diego Chargers players
Carolina Panthers players
Miami Dolphins players
Franklin High School (Portland, Oregon) alumni